Delma is a genus of lizards in the family Pygopodidae. The genus Delma contains 22 valid described species, all of which are endemic to Australia.

Species
Recognized species of Delma according to the Reptile Database:
Delma australis Kluge, 1974 – marble-faced delma
Delma borea Kluge, 1974 – rusty-topped delma
Delma butleri Storr, 1987 – Butler's legless lizard, Butler's scalyfoot, spinifex snake-lizard, unbanded delma
Delma concinna (Kluge, 1974) – javelin lizard
Delma desmosa Maryan, Aplin & Adams, 2007 – desert delma
Delma elegans Kluge, 1974 – Pilbara delma
Delma fraseri Gray, 1831 – Fraser's delma
Delma grayii A. Smith, 1849 – side-barred delma, Gray's legless lizard
Delma hebesa Maryan, Brennan, Adams & Aplin, 2015 – heath delma
Delma impar (Fischer, 1882) – striped legless lizard
Delma inornata Kluge, 1974 – patternless delma
Delma labialis Shea, 1987 – striped-tailed delma, single-striped delma
Delma mitella Shea, 1987 – Atherton delma
Delma molleri Lütken, 1863 – Gulfs delma, olive legless lizard, patternless delma
Delma nasuta Kluge, 1974 – sharp-snouted delma, sharp-snouted legless lizard
Delma pax Kluge, 1974 – peace delma
Delma petersoni Shea, 1991 – painted delma
Delma plebeia De Vis, 1888 – leaden delma
Delma tealei Maryan, Aplin & Adams, 2007 – North West Cape delma, Teale's delma
Delma tincta De Vis, 1888 – excitable delma
Delma torquata Kluge, 1974 – collared delma, adorned delma
Delma vescolineata Mahony, Cutajar, & Rowley, 2022

Nota bene: A binomial authority in parentheses indicates that the species was originally described in a genus other than Delma.

References

Further reading
Boulenger GA (1885). Catalogue of the Lizards in the British Museum (Natural History). Second Edition. Volume I. ... Pygopodidæ ... London: Trustees of the British Museum (Natural History). (Taylor and Francis, printers). xii + 436 pp. + Plates I-XXXII. (Genus Delma, p. 243).
Gray JE (1831). "Description of a new Genus of Ophisaurean Animal, discovered by the late James Hunter, Esq., in New Holland". Zoological Miscellany 1:14. (Delma, new genus).

 
Legless lizards
Pygopodidae
Lizard genera
Taxa named by John Edward Gray